In mathematics, the Riemann–von Mangoldt formula, named for Bernhard Riemann and Hans Carl Friedrich von Mangoldt, describes the distribution of the zeros of the Riemann zeta function.

The formula states that the number N(T) of zeros of the zeta function with imaginary part greater than 0 and less than or equal to T satisfies

The formula was stated by Riemann in his notable paper "On the Number of Primes Less Than a Given Magnitude" (1859) and was finally proved by Mangoldt in 1905.

Backlund gives an explicit form of the error for all T > 2:

Similarly, for any primitive Dirichlet character χ modulo q, we have

where N(T,χ) denotes the number of zeros of L(s,χ) with imaginary part between -T and T.

Notes

References
  
 
 
 

Theorems in analytic number theory
Bernhard Riemann